Cordon bleu may refer to:

 the blue ribbon of the Order of the Holy Spirit
 the blue ribbon of the Order of St. Andrew, Russian Empire
 La Cuisinière Cordon Bleu, a 19th century culinary magazine
 Le Cordon Bleu, international group of hospitality management and cooking schools teaching French cuisine
 Cordon bleu (dish), a dish of meat wrapped around cheese
 Cordon Bleu (album), by the Dutch rock group Solution
 Cordon-bleu protein, an actin nucleator protein
 Uraeginthus, a genus of birds in the family Estrildidae

See also
 Blue ribbon, as symbol for high quality
 Cordon Bleugh!, an Angry Birds Toons episode, see List of Angry Birds Toons episodes#Season 1 (2013–14)
 Blue ribbon (disambiguation)